Abigail's Footsteps is a stillbirth charity organisation in the United Kingdom founded in 2010. They have donated material to several hospitals in England where stillbirths have occurred. By 2013 they had also raised over 15 thousand pounds for the Stillbirth and Neonatal Death Society.

Personnel 
 Cheryl Baker, Vice-President

See also 
 Now I Lay Me Down to Sleep (organization)
 Stillbirth Foundation Australia
 Still Aware

References

External links 
 Official website

Stillbirth organizations
Charities based in the United Kingdom
2010 in England